Absofacto is a solo project by musician Jonathan Visger, a member of Michigan-based indie rock band Mason Proper. In 2008, Visger released his first solo efforts, North South, Pt. 1, under his own name, and Trilobite Trash, under the pseudonym Bug Lung Baby. In 2009, the EP Tagalong was released under the moniker Absofacto, the name Visger has used for all his solo musical projects since.

In 2017, Visger (as Absofacto) signed with Atlantic Records and released his major-label debut with the EP Thousand Peaces. The song "Dissolve", originally released in 2015, was included as a track on the EP and released as a single in 2018, but it failed to make any kind of impact. A year later, the song received renewed interest due to a meme on the video-sharing application TikTok and became a surprise hit. It debuted on the Billboard Alternative Songs chart in June 2019 and reached number one on the chart in January 2020.

Discography

Albums
 Sinking Islands (2011)

EPs
 Trilobite Trash (2008)
 Kiko (2011)
 Loners: Vol. 1 (2013)
 Thousand Peaces (2017)

Singles

As featured artist

References

External links

Musicians from Michigan